Hermín Negrón Santana (November 10, 1937 – March 10, 2012) was an auxiliary bishop in the Roman Catholic Archdiocese of San Juan de Puerto Rico. Santana was consecrated a bishop by John Paul II on September 7, 1981.

Biography 
He attended his secondary education at Santa Teresita Academy and bachelor's degree at the Pontifical Catholic University of Puerto Rico. Entered the minor seminary San Idelfonso in Aibonito, Puerto Rico in 1955 and joined the greater Regina Cleri Seminary in Ponce, Puerto Rico.; Attended Seminar in Baltimore and  St. Vincent de Paul Regional Seminary in Boynton Beach, Florida in 1969. His ordination was on May 30, 1969 in Caguas through laying on of the hands of Monsignor Rafael Grovas in the San Miguel Arcangel parish in Naranjito, PR. He died at his home in Caparra Heights, San Juan, Puerto Rico on the morning of March 10, 2012.

References

Episcopal succession

1937 births
2012 deaths
People from Naranjito, Puerto Rico
Pontifical Catholic University of Puerto Rico alumni
20th-century Roman Catholic bishops in Puerto Rico
20th-century Roman Catholic titular bishops
St. Vincent de Paul Regional Seminary alumni
Bishops appointed by Pope John Paul II
21st-century Roman Catholic bishops in Puerto Rico
Roman Catholic bishops of Puerto Rico